Długie Grzymki  is a village in Gmina Ceranów, Sokołów County, Masovian Voivodeship, Poland.

References

Villages in Sokołów County